Basil III (1846, Skutari – September 29, 1929, Istanbul), born Vasileios Georgiadis (Βασίλειος Γεωργιάδης), was Ecumenical Patriarch of Constantinople from July 13, 1925 until his death in 1929.

He studied theology and philology at the University of Athens, and obtained a PhD at the University of Munich.

External links
His All Holiness, Ecumenical Patriarch Basil III of Constantinople

1929 deaths
1846 births
People from Üsküdar
Bishops of Nicaea
20th-century Ecumenical Patriarchs of Constantinople
Clergy from Istanbul
Constantinopolitan Greeks